James W. Moorman (born November 22, 1937) is an American attorney who served as the United States Assistant Attorney General for the Environment and Natural Resources from 1977 to 1981.

References

1937 births
Living people
United States Assistant Attorneys General for the Environment and Natural Resources Division
Carter administration personnel